Destroy the Runner is an American heavy metal band from San Diego, California, United States. Tim Lambesis of As I Lay Dying managed them for their album  Saints, and did so again with Jason Rudolph for their second album I, Lucifer.

History

Destroy the Runner was signed by Solid State Records, on which their debut album Saints was released on September 12, 2006, to mixed reviews. Their name is reportedly a reference to the 1976 film Logan's Run.

The band followed the release of the album with a tour supporting Haste the Day and Scary Kids Scaring Kids, which was followed by tours with August Burns Red and The Chariot.

Both Kyle Setter and Jeremiah Crespo would leave the band in 2007, and were replaced by Chad Ackerman and Tanner Sparks.

In October 2007, the band began recording their second LP with Brian McTernan at Salad Days Studios in Baltimore, MD.

On April 15, 2008, Destroy the Runner released I, Lucifer. The album has a more progressive sound, with less screaming than their previous album. It charted in the U.S. on the Billboard Top Christian Albums chart at No. 27 and on the Top Heatseekers chart at No. 25.

On May 16, 2010, Destroy the Runner announced that they would taking an "indefinite hiatus".

On April 22, 2016, the band updated their Facebook. This update hinted at new material, and also reestablished the band's original members to their current lineup.

On May 1, 2016, the band announced that the four original band members were regrouping and had already written songs that were ready to be recorded for an EP, Void, through an Indiegogo campaign.

Band members

Current lineup
Nick “Maldy" Maldonado – lead guitar (2004–2010, 2016–present)
Duane Reed – rhythm guitar, vocals (2004–2010, 2016–present)
Kyle Setter – lead vocals (2004–2007, 2016–present)
Marc Kohlbry – drums (2004–2008, 2016–present)
Tanner Sparks – bass guitar (2007–2010, 2016–present)

Former members
Chad Ackerman – lead vocals (2007–2010)
Mike Catalano – drums (2008–2010)
Jeremiah Crespo – bass guitar (2005–2007)

Timeline

Discography
Studio albums
 Saints (2006) Solid State Records
 I, Lucifer (2008) Solid State Records

EPs
 Die Like Me (2004) (self-released)
 Void (2016) (self-released)

Singles
 "End Transmission" (2016)

Music videos

 Saints (Saints)
 Isabella's (I, Lucifer)

References

External links
 Destroy the Runner on Myspace

American Christian metal musical groups
Metalcore musical groups from California
Christian rock groups from California
Musical groups from San Diego
Musical groups established in 2004
Musical groups disestablished in 2010
Nu metal musical groups from California
Solid State Records artists